Özkan Hayırlı (born May 27, 1984 in İstanbul) is a Turkish volleyball player. He is 200 cm tall and plays as middle blocker. He has been playing for Fenerbahçe SK since 2009 and wears the number 1. He played 85 times for the national team and also played for İstanbul B.Ş.Bld. He studied at Istanbul University.

He signed a contract on 27 June 2009.

Honours and awards
 2008-09 Turkish Men's Volleyball League Champion
 2005 Summer Universiade Champion
 2007 Summer Universiade Champion
 2009-10 Balkan Cup Champion

External links 
 Player profile at fenerbahce.org

References

1984 births
Living people
Volleyball players from Istanbul
Turkish men's volleyball players
Fenerbahçe volleyballers
Istanbul University alumni
Universiade medalists in volleyball
Universiade gold medalists for Turkey
21st-century Turkish people